Alan Moody (born 18 January 1951) is an English former footballer who played in the Football League for Middlesbrough and Southend United.

External links
 

English footballers
English Football League players
Middlesbrough F.C. players
Southend United F.C. players
Maldon & Tiptree F.C. players
1951 births
Living people
Association football defenders